The ship Clydesdale was launched at Bay of Quick, Greenock in 1819. She sailed as an East Indiaman under a licence from the British East India Company (EIC). She was condemned at Mauritius circa June 1827 as unseaworthy while homeward bound from Bengal.

Career
The partnership of R. & A. Carsewell commenced building vessels in 1816. Clydesdale, at 584 tons (bm), was the largest vessel they launched.

R & A Carsewell launched Clydesdale in July 1819, for the East India trade. In 1813 the British East India Company (EIC) had lost its monopoly on the trade between India and Britain. British ships were then free to sail to India or the Indian Ocean under a licence from the EIC. 

In December 1819 the following advertisement appeared.

Clydesdale did not sail until February.

Clydesdale first appeared in Lloyd's Register (LR) in the supplemental pages in 1819.

Lloyd's Register reported that Clydesdale, M'Kellar, master, sailed for Calcutta on 20 February 1820. In addition to other cargo, she carried 720,000 yards of cotton goods. She arrived back in the Clyde on 5 March 1821, having left Bengal on about 28 October 1820, and from the Cape of Good Hope on 23 December. Later in 1821 she again sailed for Bengal.

Next, for her third voyage, Clydesdale sailed to Van Diemen's Land and New South Wales. In 1822 she brought as passengers Richard Aspinall, Warham Jemmett Browne, and Thomas Aspinall, nephew of Richard. In 1821 Richard and Edward Aspinall and Browne had established the trading firm of Aspinall, Browne & Co. in Liverpool. Richard Aspinall and Browne brought with them a large assortment of trade goods. They established the firm of Aspinall Browne & Co. in Sydney, with the intent of acquiring wool for Liverpool. From Sydney Clydesdale sailed for Calcutta.

In 1826 Clydesdale, Rose, master, sailed for Madras and Bengal. Both were damaged and had to return to repair damages. Clydesdale finally left Bengal for England on 15 March 1827.

Fate
On her voyage back to England on 23 May she put in to Port Louis, Mauritius leaky. She was surveyed, condemned as unseaworthy, and sold for breaking up. Rose and his officers blamed her leaks on the damage she had sustained in her collision with Juliana.

A report from Mauritius dated 7 July 1827 stated that the merchant vessel  would be bringing back part of Clydesdales cargo as Clydesdale had been condemned there. Britomart left Mauritius on 14 August, the Cape on 20 September, and St Helena on 5 October. She arrived at Deal on 2 December.

Notes

Citations

References
 
 
 
 
 

 
1819 ships
Ships built in Scotland
Age of Sail merchant ships of England
Maritime incidents in May 1827